Pennsylvania State Game Lands Number 51 are Pennsylvania State Game Lands in Fayette County, Pennsylvania

References

051
Protected areas of Fayette County, Pennsylvania